Demere Key is an archaeological site west of Pine Island, Florida. On June 13, 1972, it was added to the U.S. National Register of Historic Places.

The island is named for its early owner, Lewis Deméré (1813 – c.1880), who was born at St. Simons Island, Georgia. He and his wife, Virginia Clancy Barnard Deméré (1821–1900) and son, Raymond Barnard Deméré (1843–1905) lived on the island until about 1880.

References

External links
 Lee County listings at National Register of Historic Places
 Lee County listings at Florida's Office of Cultural and Historical Programs

Archaeological sites in Florida
Islands of Florida
National Register of Historic Places in Lee County, Florida
Uninhabited islands of Florida
Islands of Lee County, Florida
Pine Island (Lee County, Florida)